Barren Plains is an unincorporated community in Robertson County, Tennessee, in the United States.

History
A post office was established at Barren Plains in 1839, and remained in operation until it was discontinued in 1907.

References

Unincorporated communities in Robertson County, Tennessee
Unincorporated communities in Tennessee